Loch Voil is a small freshwater loch that lies to the west of Balquhidder in the Stirling council area of Scotland. It is a short, narrow loch. It is separated from Loch Doine by fluvial deposits from the Monachyle Burn and is drained at its eastern end by the River Balvag at Balquhidder. The Loch can be reached by a small single track road from Balquhidder leading to Inverlochlarig.

References 

Voil
Voil
LVoil